Alex Simon McCarthy (born 3 December 1989) is an English professional footballer who plays as a goalkeeper for  club Southampton.

A product of Reading's Academy, McCarthy spent time out on loan in the Conference Premier before signing professional terms with the club in 2008. He made his Football League debut in 2009 whilst on loan to Aldershot Town and spent the following season at Yeovil Town before making his Reading debut in 2011. He later spent time on loan at Leeds United and Ipswich Town. McCarthy left for Queens Park Rangers in 2014, moving on to Crystal Palace the following year, before joining Southampton in August 2016.

At international level McCarthy has represented England and made his debut for the under-21 team in 2010, appearing three times in total. In November 2018, he made his debut for the senior team.

Club career

Early career
Born in Guildford, Surrey, McCarthy began his career as a schoolboy at Wimbledon and Wycombe Wanderers before joining Reading on a scholarship at 16. He was a regular in the Academy team for two years and was part of a group that included several future first-team players including Jem Karacan, Alex Pearce and Gylfi Sigurðsson. His first experience of senior football came in August 2007 on loan at Woking where he made one appearance cover for the injured Nick Gindre. On 26 March 2008, he joined fellow Conference Premier team Cambridge United on work experience, making his debut two days later in a 3–0 defeat to Kidderminster Harriers. He made no further appearances and returned to Reading before signing his first professional contract in July 2008. McCarthy moved on loan again on 24 October 2008, joining Conference South team Team Bath as injury cover. He made his debut the next day in the FA Cup fourth qualifying round against Salisbury City and also played in the first round defeat to Forest Green Rovers, making four appearances in total. Another short loan spell followed with McCarthy joining League Two club Aldershot Town for one month on 2 February 2009. He made his Football League debut 12 days later in a 3–2 defeat to Exeter City and played three further matches before returning to Reading at the beginning of March.

At the start of the 2009–10 season McCarthy joined League One club Yeovil on an initial six-month loan and made his debut on 8 August in a 2–0 home win over Tranmere Rovers. A month later he received the first sending-off of his career after fouling Stockport County's Nicholas Bignall, who was also on loan from Reading. McCarthy's loan spell was renewed in January 2010 and again in February, before being extended for the rest of the season on 24 March. Over the course of his spell he played 44 league matches and kept all 12 of Yeovil's clean sheets. Following his successful loan, McCarthy was given a new three-year contract at Reading, keeping him with the club until 2013. He again departed on loan in August 2010, joining Brentford, though he remained there for just one month before being replaced by fellow Reading loanee Ben Hamer.

Reading and various loan spells
After returning from loan at Brentford in September 2010, McCarthy spent the next five months on the bench as cover for Adam Federici. He eventually made his Reading debut on 19 February 2011, coming on as a substitute for the injured Federici in the 84th minute against Watford and helping to secure a 1–1 draw. With Federici out for six weeks with knee ligament damage, McCarthy had a run in the team and made his full debut three days later in a 2–1 win over Millwall. In his next outing he saved a penalty against Crystal Palace as Reading twice came from behind to draw the match 3–3. He also played an important role in the 1–0 FA Cup fifth round win over Everton, producing a late save to deny Leon Osman in a performance described as "tremendous" by former England manager Kevin Keegan. Despite another strong display in the next round against Manchester City at Eastlands, Reading lost the match 1–0 to a Micah Richards header. He continued in goal until 30 April when he was displaced by a fit again Federici for the 0–0 draw at Coventry City and remained an unused substitute during Reading's play-off campaign.

With Federici remaining the first choice Reading goalkeeper for the 2011–12 season, McCarthy was loaned to Leeds United for a month on 4 November to gain Championship experience. An injury to Andy Lonergan and the indifferent form of Paul Rachubka saw him go straight into the team for the match against Leicester City. He kept a clean sheet on debut as the match ended in a 1–0 win. Further clean sheets against Nottingham Forest and Millwall followed and were enough to keep him in the team ahead of the returning Lonergan. In the last match of his initial spell he saved an injury time penalty against Watford, allowing Leeds to rescue a point with a last minute equaliser. Following the match, he revealed that he was keen on extending his loan at Leeds, with Reading agreeing to renew it for a second month two days later. Ineligible to face his parent club on 17 December, he was replaced by Lonergan and made no further appearances, returning to Reading on 3 January 2012. He signed a new three-year contract with Reading on 9 January before joining Ipswich Town on loan until the end of the season. On his return to Elland Road with Ipswich he was sent off for handling the ball outside the penalty area with 20 minutes remaining. Ipswich, one goal up at the time, went on to lose the match 3–1. After 10 appearances, all coming in the league, he returned to Reading at the end of the season.

2012–13 season

Again starting the season as second choice goalkeeper, several mistakes and an injury meant McCarthy replaced Adam Federici for the 3–1 defeat by Tottenham Hotspur on 16 September 2012. After debuting in the Premier League, he achieved the feat of playing in the six top levels of English football at the age of 22. He retained his place in the team for the next few matches and put in an impressive performance against Swansea City on 6 October leading to suggestions of a senior England call up in the future. His good form continued with a man of the match performance in Reading's next match against Queens Park Rangers, firstly tipping Esteban Granero's free-kick onto the crossbar before saving from Adel Taarabt at close range. The match ended badly though as he injured himself colliding with the goal post after diving to stop a Taarabt shot.

Despite initial hopes the injury was not too serious, he was forced to undergo shoulder surgery in early December potentially ruling him out for remainder of the season. He recovered quicker than expected though and returned to the team on 13 April 2013, keeping a clean sheet in a 0–0 draw with Liverpool. After making ten saves during the match, he was widely praised with his performance described as "fantastic" by Nigel Adkins and "absolutely staggering" by Liverpool manager Brendan Rodgers. He remained in goal for the rest of the season, making 14 appearances in total.

2013–14 season
In the 2013–14 season, McCarthy became first choice keeper, making 44 appearances in the Championship as Reading finished 7th, just missing out on the playoffs.

Queens Park Rangers
On 29 August 2014, McCarthy joined newly promoted Queens Park Rangers in the Premier League for an undisclosed fee. McCarthy made his Rangers debut at home against Liverpool in a blockbuster narrow 3–2 defeat.

Crystal Palace
On 23 July 2015, McCarthy joined Premier League club Crystal Palace for an undisclosed fee, reported to be £3.5 million, on a four-year contract. McCarthy made his Palace debut on 8 August 2015 in a 3–1 win away to Norwich City.

Southampton
On 1 August 2016 McCarthy joined Southampton on a three-year contract, for an undisclosed fee.

McCarthy was initially used as back-up to regular keeper Fraser Forster, but on 30 December 2017 he took over from the latter following the regular goalkeeper's drop in form.

On 27 June 2018 McCarthy signed a new four-year contract with the club, keeping him on their books until 2020. This made him one of Southampton's highest-earning players, reflecting his status as first-choice keeper. However he began the 2019–20 Premier League season as second choice behind Angus Gunn, with manager Ralph Hasenhüttl using McCarthy in the EFL Cup games. He made his first Premier League start of the season in November 2019 after Gunn had conceded nine goals to Leicester City.

On 3 January 2021 it was announced that McCarthy had tested positive for COVID-19. The positive test saw him miss Southampton's 1–0 win over Liverpool.

International career
McCarthy trained with the England under-19s before joining the under-21 set-up for the first time in September 2009. He received several further call-ups to the under-21s in 2009–10 and eventually made his debut as a second-half substitute against Uzbekistan in August 2010. In March 2011 he was named in a 31-man squad to face Denmark and Iceland as preparation for the UEFA European Under-21 Championship. He played a full 90 minutes in the first match and 45 in the second as England won 4–0 and lost 2–1 respectively. He travelled with the squad to championships in Denmark but did not play any matches, finishing with three caps at under-21 level.

In April 2012, McCarthy was named in the 80-man longlist of potential players for the Great Britain football team at the 2012 Summer Olympics, and in June, he made it down to the shortlist of 35 players provisionally selected for the tournament, although he did not make the final 18.

In May 2013 he was called up to the England senior team for the friendlies against Republic of Ireland and Brazil, becoming the first Reading youth team graduate to gain a full England call-up since the Academy era began in 1998, although he did not make an appearance. On 1 September 2016, he was called up to the senior squad again by Sam Allardyce to replace the injured Fraser Forster for a 2018 FIFA World Cup qualifier against Slovakia.

In August 2018, McCarthy was called up for England's first squad since the 2018 World Cup, for matches against Spain and Switzerland. He made his debut on 15 November as a half-time substitute in England's 3–0 win over the United States at Wembley Stadium in a friendly match, nearly five and a half years after his first call-up.

Career statistics

Club

International

Honours
Individual
Football League Young Player of the Month: March 2011
Southampton Players' Player of the Season: 2017–18
Southampton Fans' Player of the Season: 2017–18

References

External links

Profile at the Southampton F.C. website
Profile at the Football Association website

1989 births
Living people
Sportspeople from Guildford
English footballers
England under-21 international footballers
England international footballers
Association football goalkeepers
Wimbledon F.C. players
Wycombe Wanderers F.C. players
Reading F.C. players
Woking F.C. players
Cambridge United F.C. players
Team Bath F.C. players
Aldershot Town F.C. players
Yeovil Town F.C. players
Brentford F.C. players
Leeds United F.C. players
Ipswich Town F.C. players
Queens Park Rangers F.C. players
Crystal Palace F.C. players
Southampton F.C. players
National League (English football) players
English Football League players
Premier League players
Footballers from Surrey